Kusakabe Kimbei (日下部 金兵衛; 1841–1934) was a Japanese photographer. He usually went by his given name, Kimbei, because his clientele, mostly non-Japanese-speaking foreign residents and visitors, found it easier to pronounce than his family name.

Career
Kusakabe Kimbei worked with Felice Beato and Baron Raimund von Stillfried as a photographic colourist and assistant. In 1881, Kimbei opened his own workshop in Yokohama, in the Benten-dōri quarter. From 1889, the studio operated in the Honmachi quarter.

By 1893, his was one of the leading Japanese studios supplying art to Western customers. Many of the photographs in the studio's catalogue featured depictions of Japanese women, which were popular with tourists of the time. Kimbei preferred to portray female subjects in a traditional bijinga style, and hired geisha to pose for the photographs. Many of his albums are mounted in accordion fashion.

Around 1885, Kimbei acquired the negatives of Felice Beato and of Stillfried, as well as those of Uchida Kuichi. Kusakabe also acquired some of Ueno Hikoma's negatives of Nagasaki.

Kimbei retired as a photographer in 1914.

Gallery

References

Musée Nicéphore Niépce; Collection du musée Niépce. Thé/Laque/Photographie. Accessed 3 April 2006.
 Nagasaki University Library; Japanese Old Photographs in Bakumatsu-Meiji Period: "Kusakabe, Kinbei". Accessed 30 May 2008.
 Turner, Jane, ed. The Dictionary of Art, vol. 18 (New York: Grove's Dictionaries, 1996), 534.
 Union List of Artist Names, s.v. "Kimbei, Kusakabe". Accessed 3 April 2006.

External links

 Old Photos of Japan.  Kusakabe Kimbei. A selection of photographs by Kusakabe, with footnoted descriptive text. Accessed 28 May 2009.
 I Photo Central.  Kusakabe Kimbei. A selection of photographs by Kusakabe. Accessed 30 May 2008.
 Some of Kimbei Kusakabe's photos. At the Freer Gallery of Art and Arthur M. Sackler Gallery Archives.
 Fostinum: Photographs by Kusakabe Kimbei
 Photos of Japan. Kusakabe Kimbei. A collection of Japanese prints by Kusakabe Kimbei.
 Kusakabe Kimbei, photographs, Canadian Centre for Architecture

1841 births
1930s deaths
Japanese photographers
Portrait photographers